The Dolby Theatre (formerly known as the Kodak Theatre) is a live-performance auditorium in the Ovation Hollywood shopping mall and entertainment complex, on Hollywood Boulevard and Highland Avenue, in the Hollywood district of Los Angeles. Since its opening on November 9, 2001, it has been the venue of the annual Academy Awards ceremony. It is adjacent to Grauman's Chinese Theatre and near the El Capitan Theatre on Hollywood Boulevard.

Besides the Academy Awards, the venue has hosted other concerts and theatrical performances.

Architecture 

The theater was designed by David Rockwell of the Rockwell Group specifically with the Oscar ceremonies in mind.

The auditorium has become known as a venue for televised theatrical performances (e.g., American Idol and the Academy Awards). The architectural team consulted extensively with leading production personnel in Hollywood, achieving a highly functional cable infrastructure, with an underground cable bunker that crosses under the theater to truck locations on adjacent streets. Power is also substantial and accessible. The theater has a unique Rockwell-designed cockpit in the orchestra seating area for camera, sound, and stage management.

The hall from the front entrance to the grand stairway (leading up to the theater at the rear of the shopping complex) is flanked by storefronts, as well as Art Deco columns displaying the names of past recipients of the Academy Award for Best Picture (with blank spaces left for future Best Picture winners, currently set up to 2071). In a fashion reminiscent of Hollywood movie-making, the building is dressed before the Academy Awards ceremony, sometimes with a different sign on its façade, red drapery to hide its storefronts, and the famous red carpet running up its grand stairway.

History 
The theater was developed by the Academy of Motion Picture Arts and Sciences (AMPAS) to overcome logistical issues it faced hosting the Academy Awards at other venues, such as the Dorothy Chandler Pavilion and Shrine Auditorium. In August 1997, AMPAS and Canadian development firm TrizecHahn went into negotiations over the development of an entertainment complex located on the corner of Hollywood Boulevard and Highland Avenue adjacent to the Mann's Chinese Theatre. Seven months later, both the Academy and TrizecHahn agreed on a twenty-year lease that allowed for the ceremony to be staged at the new venue.

The Academy Awards were first hosted at the new theater for its 74th edition in 2002, marking the first time it was held in Hollywood since the 32nd ceremony at the Pantages Theatre in 1960. It has been the venue for all Academy Awards ceremonies held since, with the only exception being the 93rd Academy Awards in 2021—which were downsized and moved to Union Station due to the COVID-19 pandemic.

The theater was sponsored, until February 2012, by the Eastman Kodak Company, which paid $75 million for naming rights to the building. In early 2012, Eastman Kodak filed for bankruptcy protection, thus ending its naming-rights deal. Then the theater's name was temporarily changed to the Hollywood and Highland Center at the suggestion of the venue's landlord.

On May 1, 2012, it was announced that the venue would be renamed the Dolby Theatre, after Dolby Laboratories signed a 20-year naming rights deal. Dolby updated the sound system first by installing Dolby Atmos. The company plans to continue updating the auditorium with newer technologies as they become available.

Other events 
Besides the Academy Awards, the theatre has hosted other award presentations. The American Film Institute has held its Life Achievement Award gala at the theatre, It hosted the 3rd Annual Latin Grammy Awards in 2002.

From September 2011 until early 2013, the venue hosted Iris, a Cirque du Soleil residency show inspired by the history of cinema. Significant changes were made to the theater to accommodate the show, including adding lifts deep under the original floor. It was announced on November 29, 2012, that Iris would close on January 19, 2013, after only two seasons, due to lack of profit.

The reality music competition series American Idol hosted its season finales from the Dolby Theatre during its original run on Fox in 2002, from 2004 to 2007, and in 2015 and 2016. From 2016 through 2021 (excluding 2020), the theatre hosted the live shows of the NBC reality competition America's Got Talent.

See also 

 List of music venues
 L.A. Live
 Theatre

Bibliography

References

External links 

 

2001 establishments in California
Academy Awards
Concert halls in California
Dolby Laboratories
Hollywood Boulevard
Landmarks in Los Angeles
Music venues completed in 2001
Music venues in Los Angeles
Theatres in Hollywood, Los Angeles
Theatres in Los Angeles
Theatres completed in 2001